The National Library is the national library of Vanuatu. Located within the Vanuatu Cultural Centre in Port Vila, it contains about 15,000 books and serves both as a national repository for "rare and special" material, and as a lending library. It was established in April 2004.

The Library possesses two "special collections", one devoted to Vanuatu and the other to other parts of the Pacific. It holds "some 500 rare items" about Vanuatu, primarily a collection of rare books. Its "rare and special" items include "anthropological and archaeological materials, art and arts references, autobiographical records and biographies, a large section of works on the languages of Vanuatu, mission histories, oral traditions, cultural, historical and political records, journals, newspapers and periodicals".

Anne Naupa serves as Chief Librarian. In November 2013, the library established in a new building.

External links

References 

Vanuatu
Libraries in Vanuatu
Port Vila
Research libraries
2004 establishments in Vanuatu
Libraries established in 2004